SSSD may refer to:
 Scranton State School for the Deaf
 Shanksville-Stonycreek School District
 Sulphur Springs School District
 System Security Services Daemon